Petra Kronberger (born 21 February 1969, in Pfarrwerfen) is an Austrian former alpine skier, who participated in all disciplines. She was the first female alpine skier to win in all five World Cup events.

Career

Kronberger entered the World Cup circuit in the 1987/88 season. She gained several podiums and was expected to be a strong competitor at the 1988 Winter Olympic Games in Calgary. She did not win any medals there, but she did give a good performance for an athlete still in her teen years: she finished sixth in the downhill and eleventh in the combined.

Kronberger only won her first World Cup events, two downhill races, in December 1989, but by the end of that season, she had captured the World Cup overall title. This made her an instant hero in Austria: ever since that country's skiing star of the 1970s, Annemarie Pröll (later Moser-Pröll) had retired, the Swiss team had almost completely dominated the alpine world, which had long rankled the Austrian fans.

She successfully defended her World Cup overall champion title twice. Over the course of thirty-eight days in December 1990 and January 1991, Kronberger became the first skier in the modern era to win one race in each of the five alpine events in one season. Four of those wins in all but the combined came in the month of December alone, another notable feat.

At the 1991 World Championships she won a gold medal in her first event, the downhill, and was suspected to be able to win four more medals. However, she fell in her second event, the Super-G, and injured her right knee, forcing her to miss the rest of the races. (Despite her fall, she still finished sixth in that event.)

Her performances at the 1992 Winter Olympic Games in Albertville, France, were even better. She won two gold medals, one in the slalom and one in the combined, and finished a respectable fourth (with only 0.01 sec. behind the podium) the Super-G, and fifth in the downhill.

It was a great surprise when she retired as alpine skier on December 28, 1992. She said, that she had lost her motivation.

After career

Kronberger did catch up on her matriculation, did start studies in German philology and history of art at the university in the borough of Salzburg, did act as an assistant at a university. In later time she lived in Berlin and Hamburg. After dissolution she returned to the borough of Salzburg. She did work in adult vocational training and was an art guide in the "Salzburg Museum" (museum in Salzburg) and "Festung Hohensalzburg" ("Hohensalzburg Castle"), and she was a member of the Organizing Committee of the FIS Alpine Skiing World Championships 2013 at Schladming. She also is a singer in the "Salzburger Domchor" (cathedral choir at Salzburg) and the "KlangsCala" (a famous chamber choir in Salzburg). - Since November 2015, she is employed at the Austrian Skiing Federation, and since January 16, 2016, she is a "Frauenbeauftragte" (maybe translated as commissioner for women's affairs) there (cit. the German Wikipedia).

World Cup victories

Overall

Individual races

References

External links
 
 

1969 births
Living people
Austrian female alpine skiers
Olympic alpine skiers of Austria
Alpine skiers at the 1988 Winter Olympics
Alpine skiers at the 1992 Winter Olympics
Olympic gold medalists for Austria
Olympic medalists in alpine skiing
FIS Alpine Ski World Cup champions
Medalists at the 1992 Winter Olympics
20th-century Austrian women
21st-century Austrian women